Morris 2200 may refer to:

 A version of the BMC ADO17 automobile
 An early version of the Princess automobile

2200